Arthur Francis Stolkey (October 23, 1920 – December 31, 2013) was an American professional basketball player. He played in 26 games for the Basketball Association of America's Detroit Falcons in the 1946–47 season. Stolkey scored 102 points in his BAA career.

BAA career statistics

Regular season

References

External links

1920 births
2013 deaths
American men's basketball players
Basketball players from Michigan
Detroit Falcons (basketball) players
Detroit Mercy Titans men's basketball players
Guards (basketball)
Professional Basketball League of America players